"Why You Treat Me So Bad?" is a 1987 single by Club Nouveau from their 1986 album Life, Love & Pain. The basic melodic hook of the song is taken from a hit by Club Nouveau member Jay King's previous project as producer, Timex Social Club (namely, the song "Thinkin' About Ya").

The song has been sampled several times by other musicians. Hip-hop duo Luniz interpolated the song on their hit single "I Got 5 on It"; that song was then sampled by Sean 'Puff Daddy' Combs, on his hit single, "Satisfy You". Singer Ashanti sampled the song for her hit single "Only U", as well as Jennifer Lopez on "I'm Gonna Be Alright".

No Doubt singer Gwen Stefani cited the song as the reason she recorded her solo debut album Love. Angel. Music. Baby., after she listened to it while the band was on tour.

Charts

Weekly charts

Year-end charts

References

Sources 
whosampled

1986 songs
1987 singles
American songs
American contemporary R&B songs
Songs written by Thomas McElroy
Songs written by Denzil Foster